Bulathsinghalage Cyril Cooray (born 15 May 1941 in Colombo), was an international cricket umpire from Sri Lanka. He officiated in 21 Test matches and 48 ODIs.

See also
 List of Test cricket umpires
 List of One Day International cricket umpires

References

External links
 

1941 births
Living people
People from Colombo
Sri Lankan Test cricket umpires
Sri Lankan One Day International cricket umpires